The men's middleweight competition in sumo at the 2022 World Games took place on 9 July 2022 at the Boutwell Auditorium in Birmingham, United States.

Competition format
A total of 13 athletes entered the competition. They fought in the cup system with repechages.

Results

Main draw

Repechages

References